The Red Hand (German: Die rote Hand) is a 1960 West German crime thriller film directed by Kurt Meisel and starring Paul Hubschmid, Hannes Messemer and Eleonora Rossi Drago.

The film's sets were designed by the art directors Emil Hasler and Walter Kutz.

The film is inspired by the La Main Rouge affair in Western Germany.

Cast
 Paul Hubschmid as Johnny Zamaris 
 Hannes Messemer as Mahora Khan 
 Eleonora Rossi Drago as Violetta Scotoni 
 Susanne von Almassy as Maria Gomez 
 Rainer Brandt as Carnetti 
 Fritz Rémond Jr. as Theaterdirektor Jif 
 Willi Rose as Inspektor Auer 
 Kurt Waitzmann as Inspektor Wolff 
 Klaus Becker as Rolando 
 Toni Herbert as Attermann 
 Erich Fiedler as Attaché Bertrand 
 Harald Maresch as Grieche 
 Edith Schollwer as Frau Hasselbütt
 Almut Berg as Rosl 
 Edgar O. Faiss as Popoff 
 Eva Schreiber as Anni

References

Bibliography
 Bock, Hans-Michael & Bergfelder, Tim. The Concise CineGraph. Encyclopedia of German Cinema. Berghahn Books, 2009.

External links 
 

1960 films
1960 crime drama films
1960s spy drama films
German crime drama films
German spy drama films
West German films
1960s German-language films
Films directed by Kurt Meisel
Films about arms trafficking
Constantin Film films
1960s German films